Thorgeir Ljosvetningagodi Thorkelsson (born c. 940) was a lawspeaker in Iceland's Althing from 985 to 1001.

In the year 999 or 1000, Iceland's legislative assembly was debating which religion they should practice: Norse paganism or Christianity. Thorgeir, himself a pagan priest and chieftain (a gothi), decided in favour of Christianity after a day and a night of silent meditation under a fur blanket, thus averting potentially disastrous civil conflict. Under the compromise, pagans could still practice their religion in private and several of the old customs were retained. After his decision, Thorgeir himself converted to Christianity. Thorgeir's story is preserved in Ari Thorgilsson's Íslendingabók.

References

External links
Christianity, from a site on the Icelandic parliament.

Lawspeakers
Converts to Christianity from pagan religions
Thorgeir Ljosvetningagodi
940s births
11th-century deaths
Year of birth uncertain
Year of death unknown
Thorgeir Ljosvetningagodi
10th-century Christians
Goðar